The Commission de la carte d'identité des journalistes professionnels (CCiJP) is an official French government commission, composed of 30 reliable personalities concerning the press. It rules the condition of French journalists. They edit a year card with a specific number to each member. This allows professionals to enter or/and to pass barriers made by the authorities in order to allow communication and press releases. It also gives free entrance to most museums, exhibitions, theaters, cinema, etc.

Government agencies of France